Aquatics at the 2019 Southeast Asian Games are being held from 26 November to 10 December 2019.

Diving, swimming, and water polo events take place at the New Clark City Aquatics Center within New Clark City in Capas, Tarlac. Water polo events were held from 26 November to 1 December 2019, while diving and swimming events were held from 4 to 9 December 2019. The open water (swimming) event will take place on 10 December 2019 at the Hanjin Boat Terminal, Cubi Point along Subic Bay in Morong, Bataan.

Diving

Men

Women

Open water swimming

Swimming

Men

Women

Water polo

Men

Women

Medal table

References

External links
  

2019 Southeast Asian Games events
2019
Southeast Asian Games